Stepan Romanovich Senchuk (23 March 1955 – 29 November 2005) was born in the city of Prokopyevsk in Kemerovo Oblast Russia . He was part of a family that was subjected to repression. Senchuk studied at the Lviv agricultural institute (1972–1977), specializing in engineering and mechanics. From 1977 to 1993, Senchuk was on engineering and supervising posts at different agricultural enterprises. Since 1993, he was general director of Lviv's regional state enterprise, Lvivagroremmashpostach.

Background
He was the deputy of the Lviv regional council from 1994 to 1998, where he headed the Agrarian Party. From March 1997 to April 1998, Senchuk was the vice president of the Lviv-region state administration for agriculture and foodstuffs. On 14 April 1998, he was selected to be the chairman of the Lviv-region council. 

On 15 January 1999, Senchuk was appointed as governor of the Lviv region; for some time he combined two posts. On 19 March 2001 he was dismissed from the post of chairman of the state administration. On 5 July 2001 he also retired from the post of regional council chairman. 

Since 2005, Senchuk was a member of People's Union "Our Ukraine" and a delegate of the constituent congress. Most recently he held a post at a chapter of the supervisory council of Lviv corporation, "Ecolan" (a food manufacturer).

He was shot dead on 29 November 2005 at 19:20 in his car.

See also
List of unsolved murders

References

1955 births
2005 deaths
Assassinated Ukrainian politicians
Deaths by firearm in Ukraine
Governors of Lviv Oblast
Male murder victims
Our Ukraine (political party) politicians
People from Prokopyevsk
People murdered in Ukraine
People's Party (Ukraine) politicians
Russian emigrants to Ukraine
Russian people of Ukrainian descent
Unsolved murders in Ukraine
2005 murders in Ukraine